King of the Belgians is a 2016 mockumentary comedy film produced, written and directed by  Peter Brosens and Jessica Woodworth. It premiered in the Horizons section at the 73rd edition  of the Venice Film Festival. It received five nominations at the 8th Magritte Awards, including Best Flemish Film. Its sequel, The Barefoot Emperor, premiered at the 2019 Toronto International Film Festival.

Plot 
While Nicolas III, King of the Belgians, is doing an official visit to Istanbul, breaking news arrives: Wallonia just declared its independence and so Belgium doesn't exist any more. In order to face the political crisis, Nicolas III decides to quickly come back home, but due to a geomagnetic storm all the flights are blocked. Therefore, the King and his staff decide to try to reach Belgium overland, but this becomes very difficult. The hard trip becomes not only a desperate (and comical) travel across the Balkans, but also an inner trip where Nicolas III tries to understand who he really is.

Cast  
 
 Peter Van Den Begin as King Nicolas III
 Lucie Debay as Louise Vancraeyenest 
 Titus De Voogdt as Carlos 
 Bruno Georis as Ludovic Moreau 
 Goran Radaković as Dragan 
 Pieter van der Houwen as Duncan Lloyd 
 Nina Nikolina as Ana 
 Valentin Ganev as Kerim 
 Nathalie Laroche as The Queen

References

External links 
 

2010s mockumentary films
Belgian comedy films
Dutch comedy films
Bulgarian comedy films
Films shot in Brussels
Films set in Brussels
Films set in Istanbul
Films shot in Istanbul
Films set in Bulgaria
Films shot in Bulgaria
Films set in Serbia
Films shot in Serbia
Films set in Montenegro
Films shot in Montenegro
Films set in Albania
Films shot in Albania
Monarchy in fiction
Fictional kings
Films about royalty
2016 comedy films
Films set in Belgrade
Films shot in Belgrade